John Herbert Crawford may refer to:
 John Herbert Crawford (politician) (1843–1882), lawyer and politician in New Brunswick, Canada
 Jack Crawford (tennis) or John Herbert Crawford (1908–1991), Australian tennis player

See also
John Crawford (disambiguation)